The Maryland Automobile Insurance Fund (MAIF) was created in 1972 by the Maryland General Assembly as a residual market mechanism with the goal of providing automobile insurance to individuals who may not have qualified for automobile insurance in the private market.

In 2006, MAIF was the sixth largest writer of private passenger automobile insurance in the state of Maryland.

History
In 1957, it was formerly known as the Unsatisfied Claim and Judgment Fund Board. The name was changed to Maryland Automobile Insurance Fund (MAIF), on January 1, 1973.

Board of Trustees
Maryland Auto is governed by a Board of Trustees composed of nine members selected by the Governor for a five-year period, with the advice and approval of the Senate. The Executive Director manages Maryland Auto's day-to-day affairs and works at the Board of Trustees' convenience.

Notable people
 Robert L. McKinney - Chairman
 Mark D. McCurdy - Executive Director
 Cathy E. Nyce - Director (Communications & Corporate Relations Committee)
 Paul Deter - Director (Fiscal Department)
 Carlton F. Milligan - Director (Information Technology Department)
 Lois W. Oechsle - General Counsel
 Delaine McMath - Senior Manager (Internal Auditing)
 Sandra L. Dodson - Senior Manager (Government Relations)
 Joseph M. Kalinowski - Senior Manager (Imaging, Supply Room, & Building Services)
 Elizabeth A. Gruendi - Senior Manager (Casualty Unit)
 Kevin J. Wood - Senior Manager (Finance & Accounting/Collections)
 Leda A. Favor - Senior Manager (Human Resource Department)
 Deanne M. Ford - Supervisor (Uninsured Collections)

References

External links
Maryland Automobile Insurance Fund Official Site
Maryland Automobile Insurance Fund Board of Trustees
Low Cost Commercial Truck Insurance
Pascal Burke Insurance Brokerage

Vehicle insurance
Financial services companies established in 1972
Insurance companies of the United States
Automobile Insurance
Financial services companies based in Maryland
Auto insurance in the United States
1972 establishments in Maryland